Kathlene Fernström (born 26 August 1986) is a Swedish footballer who played in the fully professional Damallsvenskan, a Swedish women league, as a defender. Fernström played for Jitex BK from 2010 to 2013, where she scored three goals in 78 appearances. Fernström now plays for Kopparbergs/Göteborg FC and has, as of 25 October 2014, played 19 games, in which, she hasn't scored.

References

External links
  (archive)
  (archive)
 
 

1986 births
Swedish women's footballers
Living people
BK Häcken FF players
Jitex BK players
Damallsvenskan players
Women's association football defenders